Sylvia June Day (born March 11, 1973) is a Japanese American writer. She also writes under the pseudonyms S.J. Day and Livia Dare. She is a number one bestselling author in 29 countries.

Career 
Day writes genre fiction and literary commentary. She has also published under the pseudonyms S. J. Day and Livia Dare.

She is the co-founder of Passionate Ink, a special interest chapter of Romance Writers of America (RWA), and served on RWA's Board of Directors from 2009-13. She was the 22nd President of RWA. Day presently serves on the Authors Guild Board of Directors.

She presents workshops for writing groups and has been a speaker at events such as the RT Booklovers Convention, Romance Writers of America's National Convention, and Comic-Con.

In March 2013, Harlequin Enterprises and Hearst Corporation announced the signing of Day to a seven-figure contract to write two novellas to launch "Cosmo Red Hot Reads from Harlequin," a new collaboration between the publisher and communications giant.

In June 2013, Penguin USA agreed on an eight-figure deal for two more "Crossfire" books, with Penguin UK acquiring UK and Commonwealth rights for an additional seven-figures.

In January 2014, Macmillan's St. Martin's Press announced a two-book, eight-figure agreement with Day for a new "Blacklist" series. Penguin UK acquired UK and Commonwealth rights to the series for an additional seven-figures.

In April 2019, Amazon Publishing announced a deal for a new novella from Day for seven figures.

Crossfire 

Day's Crossfire series has 13 million English-language copies in print and international rights licensed in over 40 territories as of January 2014.

Bared to You was #62 on the Amazon.com's list of top 10 best-selling books of 2012, #5 on iTunes' Top Ten Books of the Year, and #7 on Bookscan's Top 10 Print Book Sales of 2012 – Adult Fiction. Bared to You spent forty-five weeks on The New York Times trade paperback bestseller list and sixty-seven weeks on the USA Today bestseller list.

The Crossfire series was acquired by Lionsgate Television Group for television adaptation, but Day declined a third renewal of the option and the rights have reverted to her.

Beyond Words 
In September 2015, Day launched the digital lifestyle magazine Beyond Words, which publishes daily articles covering travel, entertainment, style, wellness, and philanthropy.

Honors 

Day has been honored with the Romantic Times Reviewers' Choice Award, the EPPIE Award, the National Readers' Choice Award, and several nominations for Romance Writers of America's RITA Award.

 2007 RITA Award nominee ("Her Mad Grace")
 2007 Romantic Times Magazine Reviewers' Choice Award nominee (Passion for the Game)
 2008 RITA Award nominee ("Mischief and the Marquess")
 2008 Romantic Times Magazine Reviewers' Choice Award Winner (Don't Tempt Me)
 2008 National Readers' Choice Award Winner (Heat of the Night)
 2009 Romantic Times Magazine Reviewers' Choice Award Nominee (In the Flesh)
 2009 National Readers Choice Award Winner (In the Flesh)
 2010 Readers' Crown Award Winner (In the Flesh and Eve of Darkness)
 2012 Goodreads Choice Award Best Romance Nominee (Bared to You)
 2012 Goodreads Choice Award Best Goodreads Author Nominee
 2012 Amazon's Best Books of the Year in Romance editors' selection (Bared to You)
 2013 Goodreads Choice Award Best Romance Nominee (Entwined with You)
 2014 Amazon's Best Books of the Year in Romance editors' selection (The Stranger I Married)
 2015 Goodreads Choice Award Best Romance Nominee (Captivated by You)

Bibliography

Novels 
 Bad Boys Ahoy! (2006)
 Ask For It (2006)
 The Stranger I Married (2007)
 Eve of Darkness (2009)
 Eve of Destruction (2009)
 Eve of Chaos (2009)
 In the Flesh (2009)
 Pride and Pleasure (2011)
 Seven Years to Sin (2011)
 A Touch of Crimson (2011)
 Bared to You (2012)
 A Hunger So Wild (2012)
 Reflected in You (2012)
 Entwined with You (2013)
 Spellbound (2013)
 Captivated by You (2014)
 One with You (2016)
 So Close (2023)

Novellas 
 "Magic Fingers" in Wicked Words: Sex on Holiday (2005) and Black Lace Quickies 7 (2007) and Wicked (2012)
 "Catching Caroline" (2005)
 "Misled" (2005)
 "Kiss of the Night" (2005)
 "Snaring The Huntress" (2005)
 "Wish List" (2005) in White Hot Holidays, Vol. II (2006)
 "Treasure Hunters" in Ellora's Cavemen: Dreams of the Oasis II (2006)
 "A Familiar Kind of Magic" in Alluring Tales: Awaken the Fantasy (2007)
 "Salacious Robinson" in Got a Minute? (2007)
 "Magic and Mayhem" (2007)
 "Mischief and the Marquess" in Perfect Kisses (2007)
 "That Old Black Magic" in Alluring Tales: Hot Holiday Nights (2008)
 "Eve of Sin City" (2010)
 "Eve of Warfare" (2010) in The Mammoth Book of Paranormal Romance 2 (2010)
 "Lucien's Gamble" (2011) in Bad Boys Ahoy! (2006)
 "All Revved Up" (2011) in Wicked Reads (2011)
 "Razor's Edge" in The Promise of Love (2011)
 "Taking the Heat" in Men Out of Uniform (2011)
 "A Dark Kiss of Rapture" (2011)
 "Iron Hard" (2012) in Steamlust: Steampunk Erotic Romance (2011)
 "Black Magic Woman" (2013) in Spellbound
 "What Happened in Vegas" (2011) in Best Erotic Romance (2011)
 "Blood and Roses" in Guns and Roses (2012)
 "On Fire" in Hot in Handcuffs (2012)
 "Afterburn" (2013)
 "Aftershock" (2014)
 "Hard to Breathe" (2015) in Premiere
 "Butterfly in Frost" (2019)
 "On Carnegie Lane" (2023) in Fourteen Days: An Unauthorized Gathering

Series/Related Titles

Alluring Tales
 "A Familiar Kind of Magic" in Alluring Tales: Awaken the Fantasy (2007)
 "That Old Black Magic" in Alluring Tales: Hot Holiday Nights (2008)
 "Black Magic Woman" in Spellbound (2013)

Carnal Thirst
 Misled (2005)
 Kiss of the Night (2005)
 Declassified: Dark Kisses (2006)
 Carnal Thirst (2012)

Cosmo Red Hot Reads from Harlequin
 "Afterburn" (2013)
 "Aftershock" (2014)

Crossfire
 Bared to You (2012)
 Reflected in You (2012)
 Entwined with You (2013)
 Captivated by You (2014)
 One with You (2016)

Dream Guardians
 Pleasures of the Night (2007)
 Heat of the Night (2008)

Georgian Series
 Ask For It (2006)
 Passion for the Game (2007)
 A Passion for Him (2007)
 Don't Tempt Me (2008)

Marked Series (w/a S. J. Day)
 Eve of Darkness (2009)
 Eve of Destruction (2009)
 Eve of Chaos (2009)
 Eve of Sin City (2010)
 Eve of Warfare (2010) in The Mammoth Book of Paranormal Romance 2 (2010)

Renegade Angels
 A Dark Kiss of Rapture (2011)
 A Touch of Crimson (2011)
 A Caress of Wings (2012)
 A Hunger So Wild (2012)
 A Lush Kiss of Surrender
 A Taste of Seduction

Blacklist
 So Close (2023)

Non-Fiction 
 Perfectly Plum: Unauthorized Essays on the Life, Loves and Other Disasters of Stephanie Plum, Trenton Bounty Hunter (2007)
 The Write Ingredients: Recipes from Your Favorite Authors (2007)
 Lustfully Ever After: Fairy Tale Erotic Romance (Foreword - 2011)
 Fifty Writers on Fifty Shades of Grey (2012)
 Story of O (Introduction - 2013)
 Writing New Adult Fiction (Foreword - 2014)

Media

In April 2013, HeroesAndHeartbreakers.com broke the news that Day's Crossfire series had been optioned for television adaptation. Lions Gate Entertainment secured the rights. Kevin Beggs, President of the Lionsgate Television Group, confirmed the acquisition on August 5, 2013 in a press release. Lionsgate TV Executive Vice President Chris Selak, who was to oversee development for the studio, said, "The Crossfire series is an incredible property and it is a thrill to bring it to Lionsgate. Sylvia has created an enduring, sexy and edgy story, and we're looking forward to working with her to create a show that both excites and connects with audiences as her books have done." However, Day declined a third renewal of the option and the rights have reverted to her.

In June 2017, startup streaming entertainment company Passionflix began production of Day's Afterburn/Aftershock film adaptation. Principal photography concluded on July 29, 2017. The film debuted in November 2017.

Beyond Words: Sylvia Day, a documentary covering the world tour supporting the release of Day’s One with You, was released on October 9, 2018.

References

External links
 Sylvia Day Official website
 Tor Books Press Release for Eve of Darkness
 Berkley Books Press Release for Bared to You
 
 Sylvia Day's lifestyle magazine, Beyond Words

1973 births
Living people
Writers from California
American romantic fiction writers
21st-century American novelists
American women bloggers
American bloggers
Day, S.J.
Defense Language Institute alumni
American women novelists
21st-century American women writers
Women romantic fiction writers
Women science fiction and fantasy writers